
Year 134 BC was a year of the pre-Julian Roman calendar. At the time it was known as the Year of the Consulship of Aemilianus and Flaccus (or, less frequently, year 620 Ab urbe condita) and the First Year of Yuanguang. The denomination 134 BC for this year has been used since the early medieval period, when the Anno Domini calendar era became the prevalent method in Europe for naming years.

Events 
 By place 

 Roman Republic 
 Scipio Aemilianus, victor of Carthage, takes command in Spain against the Numantians. He recruits 20,000 men and 40,000 allies, including Numidian cavalry under Jugurtha. Scipio, an expert in sieges, builds a ring of seven forts and a ditch palisade before beginning the Siege of Numantia. The perimeter of the circumvallations is twice as long as that of the city. The river Durius (Douro), enables the defenders to be supplied by small boats.
 Caius Fulvius Flaccus, as consul, is sent against the slaves. Uprising of 4,000 slaves crushed at Sinuessa, in Campania. Slave uprisings repressed in Attic silver mines and on the island of Delos.

 Judea 
 John Hyrcanus becomes high priest and prince (ruler) of Judea, until 104 BC, following the murder of his father Simon Maccabaeus by Ptolemy the son of Abubus in 135 BC.

 China 
 On the advice of philosopher Dong Zhongshu, Emperor Wu of Han promotes Confucianism as the official doctrine of the Han Dynasty and assigns special merit to the Book of Rites, the Classic of Music, the Classic of Poetry, the Book of Documents, I Ching (the Book of Changes) and the Spring and Autumn Annals.

 By topic 

 Astronomy 
 Hipparchus discovers the precession of the equinoxes.
 Hipparchus creates a star catalogue.

Births 
 Jin Midi, Chinese politician and co-regent (d. 86 BC)
 Posidonius of Apamea, Stoic philosopher and polymath (d. 51 BC)
 Publius Servilius Vatia Isauricus, Roman statesman (d. 44 BC)

Deaths 
Simon Thassi, High Priest of Judaea (r. 142-134 BC)

References